The official flag of Mobile is a flag which represents the seal of the six flags that have flown over the state of Alabama before and since it became a state. The flag was adopted in December 1968 after one was suggested by Commissioner Lambert C. Mims. The original seal which was used in the flag was adopted in 1961.

The flag shows a red stripe moving across the top, a white stripe with the official Mobile seal in the middle and a blue stripe at the bottom.

The flag is Mobile's only ever official flag.

In 2004, the North American Vexillological Association conducted a design survey of 150 selected city flags in the United States. Mobile's flag ranked 76th with a rating of 4.05 out of 10.

References

External links
Mobile Alabama website

Flags of cities in Alabama
Flags introduced in 1968
1968 establishments in Alabama
Flag controversies in the United States